Patrick Kielty Almost Live is a Friday night aired chat show aired between 1999 and 2003 hosted by Northern Irish comedian Patrick Kielty. It was filmed in Belfast.

One of the most prolific guests was Canadian singer Shania Twain who appeared on the show several times.

Notable guests

Shania Twain
Lorraine Kelly
Tom Jones
Lee Boardman
Phill Jupitus
Gail Porter
Jason Priestley
Rory Bremner
Kelly Brook
Craig Fairbrass
Rupert Everett
Amanda Holden
Eddie Irvine
Peter Kay
Martine McCutcheon
Jimi Mistry
Tweet
Natalie & Nicole Appleton
Holly Valance
Tim Vine
Susie Amy
Ronni Ancona
Ron Atkinson
George Best
Rob Brydon

Pat Cash
Melanie C
Jeremy Clarkson
Jon Culshaw
Craig David
Jack Dee
David Dickinson
Noel Gallagher
Damon Gough
Nick Hancock
Lady Victoria Hervey
Dom Joly
Jewel Kilcher
Beenie Man
Meat Loaf
Dannii Minogue
James Nesbitt
Ardal O'Hanlon
Jack Osbourne
Tara Palmer-Tomkinson
Nina Persson
David Sneddon
Melanie Blatt
Jamie Theakston

References

External links 
 

1999 British television series debuts
2003 British television series endings
BBC Northern Ireland television shows
BBC Television shows
Culture in Belfast
Television shows from Northern Ireland
BBC television talk shows
2000s television series from Northern Ireland
1990s television series from Northern Ireland